Memory Island Provincial Park is a provincial park located on Vancouver Island in British Columbia, Canada. It was established by BC Parks on 23 August 1945 to protect a small island located at the southern end of Shawnigan Lake.

Name origin
It was named as a memorial to two Victoria men - Allan Mayhew and Kenneth Scharff - who lost their lives in World War II.

Geography
Covering only , Memory Island is the second smallest provincial park in British Columbia after Seton Portage Historic Provincial Park.

References
BC Parks webpage

Provincial parks of British Columbia
Cowichan Valley Regional District
1945 establishments in British Columbia
Protected areas established in 1945